The Siniloan Church or Saints Peter and Paul Parish Church is the only Roman catholic church in the municipality of Siniloan, Laguna, Philippines under the Roman Catholic Diocese of San Pablo. Its titular is Saint Peter and Saint Paul whose feast falls every June 29.

Church history 
Siniloan was established as a reduccion by Father Juan de la Plasencia and Father Diego de Oropeza in 1579 and was formalized in 1583 as Guilinguiling. The first church of Siniloan, based on the records of Huerta, was dedicated to the Our Lady of Purification (Purificacion de Nuestra Señora). In 1599, the supreme government allowed the establishment of a stone church. In 1604, the church was placed under the advocacy of Saints Peter and Paul. The old church was built from 1733 to 1739 under the term of Father Melchor de San Antonio. At that time, location north of the church is a small chapel dedicated to Saint Sebastian, the martyr. It was heavily damaged during the 1880 Luzon earthquakes and was rebuilt from 1890 to 1898. Another earthquake in 1937 damaged the church. Due to its restoration, the church practically has no more traces of its classical and Spanish style. For its quadricentennial anniversary in 2004, the church was reconstructed, modernized and remodeled as twice the size of the previous church under Msgr. Mario Rafael M. Castillo's term. The inauguration and solemn blessing of the newly constructed church was held on November 20, 2004 officiated by the then Bishop of San Pablo, Most. Rev. Leo M. Drona, SDB.

Notes

Bibliography

External links

Roman Catholic churches in Laguna (province)
Marked Historical Structures of the Philippines
Roman Catholic churches completed in 1898
1604 establishments in the Philippines
19th-century Roman Catholic church buildings in the Philippines
Churches in the Roman Catholic Diocese of San Pablo